Anastasia Chernaya (born ) is a Russian volleyball player, playing as an opposite. She is part of the Russia women's national volleyball team.

She competed at the 2015 European Games in Baku. On club level she played for Avtodor-Metar in 2015.

References

1987 births
Living people
Russian women's volleyball players
Place of birth missing (living people)
European Games competitors for Russia
Volleyball players at the 2015 European Games
Universiade medalists in volleyball
Universiade gold medalists for Russia
Medalists at the 2015 Summer Universiade
20th-century Russian women
21st-century Russian women